NAM Air is an Indonesian regional airline based at Soekarno Hatta International Airport in Jakarta, Indonesia. The airline was founded on 26 September 2013, and operates as regional feeder subsidiary for Sriwijaya Air. The airline serves smaller markets not targeted by its parent company.

History

Launch (2013) 
The creation of NAM Air was announced on 26 September 2013, originally envisioned as a full-service subsidiary for the Sriwijaya Air Group that was to compete with the Indonesian state-owned flag carrier, Garuda Indonesia and Lion Air Group's Batik Air. The airline's inception was announced by Sriwijaya Air President, Chandra Lie, who dedicated the airline in the name of his father, Lo Kui Nam. 

The airline's full service intentions was later scrapped in favour of being a feeder carrier to Sriwijaya Air, akin to the relationship between Wings Air and Lion Air; under this arrangement, Sriwijaya Air would serve mainline routes, whereas NAM Air would operate secondary routes not targeted by its parent. 

Following the announcement, the airline planned on launching its maiden flight in October 2013. The launch was later postponed due to the pending issuance of the carrier's Air Operator's Certificate (AOC) by the Indonesian Ministry of Transportation. NAM Air acquired its AOC on 29 November 2013 and flew its first testing flight from Jakarta to Pangkal Pinang on 11 December 2013. On 19 December 2013, the airline operated its maiden commercial flight from Jakarta to Pontianak to Yogyakarta with a Boeing 737-500 aircraft equipped with 120 seats in two classes. Upon its launch, NAM Air became the first airline to allow its female flight attendants to use a hijab as part of their uniform on any given flight.

Lifting from EU Blacklist (2018) 
NAM Air was included in the EU airline blacklist of carriers that did not meet necessary safety standards to fly to airports in the European Union, and was thus banned from operating in European airspace. It was removed from the blacklist, along with every other Indonesian airline in June 2018.

Garuda Indonesia management (2018-2019) 
On 8 November 2018, NAM Air and its parent, Sriwijaya Air, entered a cooperation agreement with Garuda Indonesia, effectively taking over the operations and financial management of both airlines through its subsidiary, Citilink Indonesia. The agreement was made in order to facilitate the financial recovery of the struggling Sriwijaya Air Group through the improvement of operations and financial performance with help of the Garuda Indonesia Group. The agreement was terminated on 15 November 2019 after disputes between the two parties.

Destinations 

As of February 2023, NAM Air flies an entirely domestic network to the following destinations:

Fleet

Current fleet 
The NAM Air fleet consists of the following aircraft, with an average fleet age of 28 years (as of March 2023):

Former fleet 

 5 ATR 72-500 (out of service and stored indefinitely)

References

External links 

 

Airlines formerly banned in the European Union
Airlines of Indonesia
Airlines established in 2013
Indonesian companies established in 2013